Bob Ross (April 2, 1934December 13, 2003) was the co-founder and former publisher of the Bay Area Reporter and a key gay rights and AIDS activist in San Francisco. For his lifetime work he was inducted into the National Lesbian and Gay Journalists Association Hall of Fame for creating two of the "most well-respected and enduring LGBT publications in the country".

Biography

Ross was born in New York City and moved to San Francisco in 1956. He was working as a chef at the time he started Bay Area Reporter in 1971 with friend Paul Bentley.

In addition to the Bay Area Reporter, Ross published the long-running Gay Comix, beginning in 1985 and continuing until 1998.

He was criticized by some for his more moderate policies, sometimes leaning toward the conservative, with gay rights being seen by many as a primarily liberal issue.

He died December 9, 2003, due to complications from diabetes.

Bob Ross Foundation
In 1996, he established the Bob Ross Foundation, which donated to a "broad portfolio of nonprofits." In 2016, the foundation donated $50,000 to purchase equipment for the GLBT Historical Society to digitize and publish a complete searchable archive of the Bay Area Reporter from the first issue in 1971 until 2005 when the newspaper began online operations.

Awards and honors
The annual scholarship awarded by the National Lesbian and Gay Journalists Association of Northern California is named for Bob Ross. It was established in 2006.

On June 28, 2010, Buckley added to his title of publisher the position of president of print, animation and digital divisions of Marvel Worldwide.

In 2013, the National Lesbian and Gay Journalists Association inducted Bob Ross into the HLGJA Hall of Fame.

In 2017, The Bob Ross LGBT Senior Center was opened. It is the first in San Francisco dedicated to the needs of the LGBT senior community.

References

1934 births
2003 deaths
American LGBT rights activists